Hot chocolate, also known as hot cocoa or drinking chocolate, is a heated drink consisting of shaved or melted chocolate or cocoa powder, heated milk or water, and usually a sweetener. It is often garnished with whipped cream or marshmallows. Hot chocolate made with melted chocolate is sometimes called drinking chocolate, characterized by less sweetness and a thicker consistency.

The drink became popular in Europe after being introduced from Mexico in the New World and has undergone multiple changes since then. Until the 19th century, hot chocolate was used medicinally to treat ailments such as liver and stomach diseases.

Hot chocolate is consumed throughout the world and comes in multiple variations, including the spiced  of Latin America, the very thick  served in Italy and  served in Spain, and the thinner hot cocoa consumed in the United States. Prepared hot chocolate can be purchased from a range of establishments, including cafeterias, fast food restaurants, coffeehouses and teahouses. Powdered hot chocolate mixes, which can be added to boiling water or hot milk to make the drink at home, are sold at grocery stores and online.

History

Archaeologists have found evidence that Mayan chocolate consumption occurred as early as 500 BC, and there is speculation that chocolate predates even the Mayans. To make the chocolate drink, which was served cold, the Maya ground cocoa seeds into a paste and mixed it with water, cornmeal, chili peppers, and other ingredients. They then poured the drink back and forth from a cup to a pot until a thick foam developed. Chocolate was available to Maya of all social classes, although the wealthy drank chocolate from "large spouted vessels" that were often buried with elites. An early Classic period (460-480 AD) Mayan tomb from the site of Rio Azul, Guatemala, had vessels with the Maya glyph for cacao on them with residue of a chocolate drink.

Because sugar was yet to come to the Americas,  was said to be an acquired taste.  What the Spaniards then called  was said to be a drink consisting of a chocolate base flavored with vanilla and other spices that was served cold. The drink tasted spicy and bitter as opposed to sweetened modern hot chocolate. As to when  was first served hot, sources conflict on when and by whom. However, José de Acosta, a Spanish Jesuit missionary who lived in Peru and then Mexico in the later 16th century, described  as:

Loathsome to such as are not acquainted with it, having a scum or froth that is very unpleasant taste. Yet it is a drink very much esteemed among the Indians, where with they feast noble men who pass through their country. The Spaniards, both men and women, that are accustomed to the country, are very greedy of this Chocolate. They say they make diverse sorts of it, some hot, some cold, and some temperate, and put therein much of that "chili"; yea, they make paste thereof, the which they say is good for the stomach and against the catarrh. Within Mesoamerica many drinks were made from cacao beans, and further enhanced by flowers like vanilla to add flavor. This was a tribute to the Aztecs. The Aztecs, or Mexica, required conquered people to provide them with chocolate. Cups, gourds, cacao beans, as well as others things they acquired were listed in The Essential Codex Mendoza. Cacao became used as a currency throughout Mesoamerica. The Aztecs used chocolate to show high status: it was a bad omen for someone low or common to drink chocolate. Europeans' first recorded contact with chocolate was not until 1502 on Columbus's fourth voyage.

European Adaptation

After defeating Montezuma's warriors and demanding that the Aztec nobles hand over their valuables, Cortés returned to Spain in 1528, bringing cocoa beans and chocolate drink making equipment with them. At this time, chocolate still only existed in the bitter drink invented by the Mayas. Sweet hot chocolate and bar chocolate were yet to be invented. After its introduction to Europe, the drink slowly gained popularity. The Imperial Court of Emperor Charles V soon adopted the drink, and what was then only known as "chocolate" became a fashionable drink popular with the Spanish upper class. Additionally, cocoa was given as a dowry when members of the Spanish Royal Family married other European aristocrats. At the time, chocolate was very expensive in Europe because the cocoa beans only grew in South America.

Sweet-tasting hot chocolate was then invented, leading hot chocolate to become a luxury item among the European nobility by the 17th century. Even when the first Chocolate House (an establishment similar to a modern coffee shop) opened in 1657, chocolate was still very expensive, costing 50 to 75 pence (approximately 10–15 shillings) a pound (roughly £45–65 in 2016). At the time, hot chocolate was often mixed with spices for flavor; one notable recipe was hot chocolate "infused with fresh jasmine flowers, amber, musk, vanilla and ambergris." In the late 17th century, Sir Hans Sloane, president of the Royal College of Physicians, visited Jamaica, where he was introduced to cocoa. He found it 'nauseous' but by mixing it with milk made it more palatable. When Sloane returned to England, he brought the recipe with him, introducing milk chocolate to England.  The aristocratic nature of the drink led to chocolate being referred to as "the drink of the gods" in 1797.

The Spanish began to use  made of porcelain in place of the hollowed gourds used by the natives. They then further tinkered with the recipes by using spices such as cinnamon, black pepper, anise, and sesame. Many of these things were used to try to recreate the flavor of the native flowers which they could not easily acquire. Black pepper was used to replace chillies and mecaxochitl, cinnamon was used in place of orejuelas, sugar replaced honey.

In 1828, Coenraad Johannes van Houten developed the first cocoa powder producing machine in the Netherlands. The press separated the greasy cocoa butter from cacao seeds, leaving a purer chocolate powder behind. This powder was easier to stir into milk and water. As a result, another very important discovery was made: solid chocolate. By using cocoa powder and low amounts of cocoa butter, it was then possible to manufacture chocolate bars. The term  chocolate then came to mean solid chocolate rather than hot chocolate, with the first chocolate bar being created in 1847.

According to tradition, the Italian version cioccolata calda was first born in Turin around 1560. To celebrate that the capital of the Duchy of Savoy was moved from Chambéry to Turin, Emmanuel Philibert, Duke of Savoy asked for a new beverage, and so this thicker, creamy version was created.

Terminology

A distinction is sometimes made between "hot cocoa", made from cocoa powder (ground cacao beans from which much of the cocoa butter has been removed), and "hot chocolate", made directly from bar chocolate, which already contains cocoa, sugar, and cocoa butter. Thus, the major difference between the two is the cocoa butter, the absence of which makes hot cocoa significantly lower in fat than hot chocolate while still preserving all the antioxidants found in chocolate.

 Hot chocolate can be made with dark, semisweet, or bittersweet chocolate grated or chopped into small pieces and stirred into milk with the addition of sugar. 
 Cocoa usually refers to a drink made with cocoa powder, hot milk or water, and sweetened to taste with sugar (or not sweetened at all). 
 Instant hot chocolate or hot cocoa mix may be based on cocoa powder, powdered chocolate, or both; often includes powdered milk or comparable ingredients so it can be made without using milk; sugar or other sweeteners; and typically stabilizers and thickeners. However, mixes can vary widely (between countries and often between brands) in ingredients included, their ratio and their quality.

Ingredients

Add-ons

Fat
Cream is frequently added to hot chocolate.

Theobromine found in the cocoa solids is fat soluble. Cocoa beans contain significant amount of fats, but cocoa powder is usually defatted. However, adding fat to defatted cocoa powder will increase its bioavailability.

Alcohol 
Rum is added to hot chocolate to make a Lumumba.

Usage
Today, hot chocolate in the form of drinking chocolate or cocoa is considered a comfort food and is widely consumed in many parts of the world.  European hot chocolate tends to be relatively thick and rich, while in the United States the thinner instant version is consumed more often.  In Nigeria, hot chocolate is referred to as "tea" even though it is not actually a tea due to the Nigerian custom of referring to drinks consumed in the morning as "tea". Many regions have distinctive additives or toppings, ranging from marshmallow and whipped cream to cheese.

Europe

In mainland Europe (particularly Spain and Italy), hot chocolate is sometimes served very thick due to the use of a thickening agent such as cornstarch. One of the thick forms of hot chocolate served in Europe is the Italian .

Hot chocolate with churros is the traditional working-man's breakfast in Spain. This style of hot chocolate can be extremely thick, often having the consistency of warm chocolate pudding. It is often served at home or in cafes. In France, hot chocolate is often served at breakfast time. Sometimes sliced bread spread with butter, jam, honey, or Nutella is dunked into the hot chocolate.

In Germany, hot chocolate made by melted chocolate is distinguished from those made from powders. It is often served with whipped cream on top.

Even further variations of hot chocolate exist. One Viennese variant, contains an egg yolk for thickness.

North America

In the United States and Canada, the drink is popular in instant form, made with hot water or milk from a packet containing mostly cocoa powder, sugar, and dry milk. This is the thinner of the two main variations. It is very sweet and may be topped with marshmallows, whipped cream, or a piece of solid chocolate. Hot chocolate was first brought to North America as early as the 17th century by the Dutch, but the first time colonists began selling hot chocolate was around 1755. Traditionally, hot chocolate has been associated with cold weather and winter in the United States and Canada.

Hot chocolate mixed with espresso or coffee is trending in coffee shops around the United States (and all over the world) under the name of caffè mocha.  This particular name comes from the town Mocha, Yemen, where a specific blend of coffee with the same name is grown.

In Mexico, hot chocolate remains a popular national drink, often including semi-sweet chocolate, cinnamon, sugar, and vanilla. Hot chocolate of this type is commonly sold in circular or hexagonal tablets which can be dissolved into hot milk, water, or cream, and then blended until the mixture develops a creamy froth. A 1942 article in the Chicago Tribune describes Mexican cinnamon hot chocolate as being traditionally served alongside a variety of sweet Mexican pastries, such as pan dulce or churros.

South America
In Colombia, a hot chocolate drink made with milk and water using a chocolatera and molinillo is enjoyed as part of breakfast with bread and soft, fresh farmer's cheese.  Colombian hot chocolate is often topped with a soft farmer's cheese or other mild cheese. Similarly, hot chocolate in Ecuador is often topped with cheese.

In Peru, hot chocolate can be served with panettone at breakfast on Christmas Day, even though summer has already started in the southern hemisphere. In addition, many Peruvians will add a sweet chocolate syrup to their drink. 

The Argentinian submarino is a hot chocolate drink made from adding a chocolate bar and sugar to hot steamed milk.

Spanish East Indies

In the Philippines, the native hot chocolate drink is known as tsokolate. It is made from tabliya (or ), tablets of pure ground roasted cacao beans, dissolved in water and milk. Like in Spanish and Latin American versions, the drink is traditionally made in a tsokolatera and briskly mixed with a wooden baton called the molinillo (also called  or ), causing the drink to be characteristically frothy.  is typically sweetened with a bit of muscovado sugar and has a distinctive grainy texture.

All are derived from Spanish chocolate ('chocolate').

 is commonly consumed at breakfast with traditional kakanin delicacies or pandesal and other types of bread. It is also popular during Christmas season in the Philippines.

Health

From the 16th to 19th centuries, hot chocolate was valued as a medicine as well as a drink.

The explorer Francisco Hernández wrote that chocolate drinks helped treat fever and liver disease. Another explorer, Santiago de Valverde Turices, believed that large amounts of hot chocolate were helpful in treating chest ailments and that smaller amounts could help stomach disorders. When chocolate was introduced to the French in the 17th century, it was reportedly used "to fight against fits of anger and bad moods", which may be attributed to chocolate's phenylethylamine content. Today, hot chocolate is consumed for pleasure rather than medicinally, but new research suggests that there may be other health benefits attributed to the drink.

Several negative effects can be attributed to drinking hot chocolate, as some hot chocolate recipes contain high amounts of sugar, hydrogenated oils, or fats.

When chocolate first began to grow in popularity it was opposed by the Catholic church. It was seen to lack the ability to break fast, seeing as it was consumed in its liquid form. Coffee was the other popular trend which was seen as good for the body but bad for the mind. Chocolate began being consumed as a way to replenish one's body from the effects that coffee caused. It was said to nourish one's body and potency.

Benefits

Research has shown that the consumption of hot chocolate can be positive for one's health. A study conducted by Cornell University has shown that hot chocolate contains more antioxidants than wine and tea, therefore reducing the risk of heart disease. In a single serving of cocoa, the researchers found 611 milligrams of gallic acid equivalents (GAE) and 564 milligrams of epicatechin equivalents (ECE), compared with 340 milligrams of GAE and 163 milligrams of ECE in red wine, and 165 milligrams of GAE and 47 milligrams of ECE in green tea. Chang Yong Lee, the professor and researcher at Cornell who conducted the study, revealed that larger amounts of antioxidants are released when the drink is heated.

The flavonoids found in the cocoa that makes up hot chocolate also have a positive effect on arterial health. A particular study performed by the National Institutes of Health partially supported by Mars Chocolate company showed high amounts of improvement in blood flow after drinking a flavanol-rich cocoa drink. In the study, the subjects (27 people ages 18 to 72) drank a cocoa drink containing 900 milligrams of flavonols every day, which resulted in an improvement in blood flow and the function of endothelial cells that line blood vessels.

In further studies conducted by Dr. Norman K. Hollenberg, professor of medicine at Brigham and Women's Hospital and Harvard Medical School found that flavonols may also help vessels dilate and help keep platelets from clustering on the blood vessel walls. Flavonoids found in hot chocolate are beneficial to health mainly because they shield the walls of blood vessels from free radical damage. Flavanols are also thought to help reduce blood platelet buildup and can balance levels of compounds called eicosanoids, which may be beneficial to cardiovascular health.

Risks
Several negative effects may be attributed to the drinking of hot chocolate. The types and severity of health risks vary between different styles of hot chocolate. Hot chocolate made from milk also contains lactose naturally found in milk. Processed cocoa powder usually contains additional sugars. Some brands also contain hydrogenated oils and fats, the most common of which are coconut derivatives.

See also 
 Champurrado, hot chocolate's Mexican counterpart
 Chocolate milk
 Cuestión moral: si el chocolate quebranta el ayuno eclesiástico (Whether chocolate breaks ecclesiastical fast: a moral question)
 Hot chocolate effect
 List of chocolate drinks
 List of hot drinks

References

Further reading
 Morton, Frederic; Morton, Marcia (1986). Chocolate, an Illustrated History. Crown Publishers. .
 Turback, Michael (2005). Hot Chocolate. Ten Speed Press. .

External links 
 
 

Chocolate drinks
Hot drinks
Mesoamerican cuisine
Mexican drinks
Non-alcoholic drinks
Christmas food
Mexican chocolate
Articles containing video clips
Food combinations